Mount Dalhousie is a summit in Jasper National Park in Alberta, Canada.

Mount Dalhousie was named in tribute to the Earl of Dalhousie.

References

Dalhousie
Alberta's Rockies